Baorini is a tribe in the Hesperiinae subfamily of skipper butterflies.

Genera
 Baoris
 Borbo
 Brusa
 Caltoris
 Gegenes
 Iton
 Parnara
 Pelopidas
 Polytremis
 Prusiana
 Pseudoborbo
 Tsukiyamaia
 Zenonia

References 

 , 1991: A Revision of the Genus Parnara Moore (Lepidoptera, Hesperiidae), with Special Reference to the Asian Species. Tyô to Ga 42 (3): 179-194. Full article: .

Hesperiinae
Butterfly tribes